Aleuron prominens is a moth of the family Sphingidae. It was described by Francis Walker in 1856. It is known from Brazil.

There are probably multiple generations per year.

The larvae have been recorded on Doliocarpus dentatus and Curatella americana, but probably also feed on other Dilleniaceae species.

References

Aleuron
Moths described in 1856
Moths of South America